Jacques Dutronc is the first studio album by the French singer-songwriter Jacques Dutronc, released in 1966. Since Dutronc's first seven albums are all self-titled, the album is commonly referred to by the title of any of its three tracks which were released as singles ("Et moi, et moi, et moi", "Les play boys" and "Les Cactus").

Reception 
The album went straight to number one in the French charts upon its release and sold over a million copies in total. 
The single "Les play boys" was number one in the French charts from 3 December 1966 until 13 January 1967. In recognition of the album's success, Dutronc was awarded a special Grand Prix du Disque by the Académie Charles Cros, in memoriam of one of its founders.

The album is included in Philippe Manœuvre's 2010 book Rock français, de Johnny à BB Brunes, 123 albums essentiels, which contains reviews of the 123 "most essential" French-language rock albums.

Track listing 
Words by Jacques Lanzmann and music by Jacques Dutronc, with the exception of La Compapadé, words and music by Jacques Dutronc.

Personnel
Jacques Dutronc - voice, rhythm and lead guitars, percussion, arrangements, orchestra director
Hadi Kalafate - bass, percussion
Alain Le Govic (alias Alain Chamfort) - piano, organ
Jean-Pierre Alarcen - guitar
Jacques Pasut - rhythm guitar
Michel Pelay - drums
Technical
Jean-Marie Périer - photography

References 

1966 debut albums
Jacques Dutronc albums